Papua is a province of Indonesia, comprising the northern coast of Western New Guinea together with island groups in Cenderawasih Bay to the west. It roughly follows the borders of Papuan customary region of Tabi Saireri. It is bordered by the sovereign state of Papua New Guinea to the east, the Pacific Ocean to the north, Cenderawasih Bay to the west, and the provinces of Central Papua and Highland Papua to the south. The province also shares maritime boundaries with Palau in the Pacific. Following the splitting off of twenty regencies to create the three new provinces of Central Papua, Highland Papua, and South Papua on 30 June 2022, the residual province is divided into eight regencies (kabupaten) and one city (kota), the latter being the provincial capital of Jayapura. The province has a large potential in natural resources, such as gold, nickel, petroleum, etc. Papua, along with five other Papuan provinces, has a higher degree of autonomy level compared to other Indonesian provinces.

The island of New Guinea has been populated for tens of thousands of years.  European traders began frequenting the region around the late 16th century due to spice trade. In the end, the Dutch Empire emerged as the dominant leader in the spice war, annexing the western part of New Guinea into the colony of Dutch East Indies. The Dutch remained in New Guinea until 1962, even though other parts of the former colony has declared independence as the Republic of Indonesia in 1945. Following negotiations and conflicts with the Indonesian government, the Dutch transferred Western New Guinea to a United Nations Temporary Executive Authority (UNTEA), which was again transferred to Indonesia after the controversial Act of Free Choice. The province was formerly called Irian Jaya and comprised the entire Western New Guinea until the inauguration of the province of West Papua (then West Irian Jaya) in 2001. In 2002, Papua adopted its current name and was granted a special autonomous status under Indonesian legislation.

The province of Papua remains one of the least developed provinces in Indonesia. As of 2020, Papua has a GDP per capita of Rp 56.1 million (US$ 3,970), ranking 11th place among all Indonesian provinces. However, Papua only has a Human Development Index of 0.604, the lowest among all Indonesian provinces. The harsh New Guinean terrain and climate is one of the main reasons why infrastructure in Papua is considered to be the most challenging to be developed among other Indonesian regions.

The 2020 Census revealed a population of 4,303,707, of which the majority were Christian. The official estimate for mid 2022 was 4,418,581 prior to the division of the province into four separate provinces. The official estimate of the population in mid 2022 of the reduced province was 1,034,956. The interior is predominantly populated by ethnic Papuans while coastal towns are inhabited by descendants of intermarriages between Papuans, Melanesians and Austronesians, including the Indonesian ethnic groups. Migrants from the rest of Indonesia also tend to inhabit the coastal regions. The province is also home to some uncontacted peoples.

History

Etymology 

There are several theories regarding the origin of the word Papua. One theory is that the name comes from the word 'Papo Ua', named by the Tidore Sultanate, which in the Tidore language means "not joining" or "not being united", meaning that there was no king who rules the area. Before the age of colonization, the Tidore Sultanate controlled some parts of the Bird's Head Peninsula in what is now the provinces of West Papua and Southwest Papua before expanding to also include coastal regions in the current province of Papua. This relationship plays an important historical role in binding the archipelagic civilizations of Indonesia to the Papuan world. Another theory is that the word Papua comes from the Malay word 'papuwah', which means 'frizzled hair'. It was first mentioned in the 1812 Malay Dictionary by William Marsden, although it was not found in earlier dictionaries. In the records of 16th century Portuguese and Spanish sailors, the word 'Papua' is the designation for the inhabitants of the Raja Ampat Islands and the coastal parts of the Bird's Head Peninsula.
The former name of the province, Irian Jaya, was suggested during a tribal committee meeting in Tobati, Jayapura, formed by Atmoprasojo, head of the bestuur school in the 1940s. Frans Kaisiepo, the committee leader suggested the name from Mansren Koreri myths, Iri-an from the Biak language of Biak Island, meaning "hot land" referring to the local hot climate, but also from Iryan which means heated process as a metaphor for a land that is entering a new era. In Serui Iri-an ( land-nation) means "pillar of nation", while in Merauke Iri-an ( placed higher-nation) means "rising spirit" or "to rise". The name was promoted in 1945 by Marcus Kaisiepo, brother of the future governor Frans Kaisiepo. The name Irian was politicized later by Marthin Indey and Silas Papare with the Indonesian acronym 'Ikut Republik Indonesia Anti Nederland' (Join the Republic of Indonesia oppose the Netherlands). The name was used throughout the Suharto administration, until it was changed to Papua during the administration of President Abdurrahman Wahid.

The Dutch, who arrived later under Jacob Le Maire and Willem Schouten, called it Schouten island. They later used this name only to refer to islands off the north coast of Papua proper, the Schouten Islands or Biak Island. When the Dutch colonized this island as part of the Dutch East Indies, they called it Nieuw Guinea.

Speakers align themselves with a political orientation when choosing a name for the western half of the island of New Guinea. The official name of the region is "Papua" according to International Organization for Standardization (ISO). Independence activists refer to the region as "West Papua," while Indonesian officials have also used "West Papua" to name the westernmost province of the region since 2007. Historically, the region has had the official names of Netherlands New Guinea (1895–1962), West New Guinea or West Irian (1945–73), Irian Jaya (1973–2002), and Papua (2002–present).

Pre-colonial era 

Papuan habitation of the region is estimated to have begun between 42,000 and 48,000 years ago. Research indicates that the highlands were an early and independent center of agriculture, and show that agriculture developed gradually over several thousands of years; the banana has been cultivated in this region for at least 7,000 years. Austronesian peoples migrating through Maritime Southeast Asia settled in the area at least 3,000 years ago, and populated especially in Cenderawasih Bay. Diverse cultures and languages have developed in the island due to geographical isolation; there are over 300 languages and two hundred additional dialects in the region.

Ghau Yu Kuan, a Chinese merchant, came to Papua around the latter half of 500 AD and referred to it as Tungki, the area where they obtained spices. Meanwhile, in the latter half of 600 AD, the Sumatra-based empire of Srivijaya referred to the island as Janggi. The empire engaged in trade relations with western New Guinea, initially taking items like sandalwood and birds-of-paradise in tribute to China, but later making slaves out of the natives. It was only at the beginning of 700 AD that traders from Persia and Gujarat began to arrive in what is now Papua and called it Dwi Panta or Samudrananta, which means 'at edge of the ocean'.  

The 14th-century Majapahit poem Nagarakretagama mentioned Wwanin or Onin and Sran as a recognized territory in the east, today identified as Onin peninsula in Fakfak Regency in the western part of the larger Bomberai Peninsula south of the Bird's Head Peninsula. At that time, Papua was said to be the eighth region of the Majapahit Empire. Wanin or Onin was one of the oldest indigenous names in recorded history to refer to the western part of the island of New Guinea. A transcript from the Nagarakretagama says the following:

 Ikang sakasanusasanusa Makasar Butun Banggawai Kuni Ggaliyao mwang i [ng] Salaya Sumba Solot Muar muwah tigang i Wandan Ambwan Athawa maloko Ewanin ri Sran ini Timur ning angeka nusatutur.

According to some linguists, the word Ewanin is another name for Onin as recorded in old communal poems or songs from Wersar, while Sran popularly misunderstood to refers to Seram Island in Maluku, is more likely another name for a local Papuan kingdom which in its native language is called Sran Eman Muun, based in Kaimana and its furthest influence extends to the Kei Islands, in southeastern Maluku. In his book Nieuw Guinea, Dutch author WC. Klein explained the beginning of the influence of the Bacan Sultanate in Papua. There he wrote: In 1569 Papoese hoof den bezoeken Batjan. Ee aanterijken worden vermeld (In 1569, Papuan tribal leaders visited Bacan, which resulted in the creation of new kingdoms). According to the oral history of the Biak people, there used to be a relationship and marriage between their tribal chiefs and the sultans of Tidore in connection with Gurabesi, a naval leader of Waigeo from Biak. The Biak people is the largest Melanesian tribe, spread on the northern coast of Papua, making the Biak language widely used and considered the language of Papuan unity. Due to the relationship of the coastal areas of Papua with the Sultans of Maluku, there are several local kingdoms on this island, which shows the entry of feudalism.

Since the 16th century, apart from the Raja Ampat Islands which was contested between the Bacan Sultanate, Tidore Sultanate, and Ternate Sultanate, other coastal areas of Papua from the island of Biak to Mimika became vassals of the Tidore Sultanate. The Tidore Sultanate adheres to the trade pact and custom of Uli-Siwa (federation of nine), there were nine trade partners led by Tidore in opposition to the Ternate-led Uli Lima (federation of five). In administering its regions in Papua, Tidore divide them to three regions, Korano Ngaruha (  Four Kings ) or Raja Ampat Islands, Papoua Gam Sio (  Papua The Nine Negeri ) and Mafor Soa Raha (  Mafor The Four Soa ). The role of these kingdoms began to decline due to the entry of traders from Europe to the archipelago marking the beginning of colonialism in the Indonesian Archipelago. During Tidore's rule, the main exports of the island during this period were resins, spices, slaves and the highly priced feathers of the bird-of-paradise. Sultan Nuku, one of the most famous Tidore sultans who rebelled against Dutch colonization, called himself "Sultan of Tidore and Papua", during his revolt in the 1780s. He commanded loyalty from both Moluccan and Papuan chiefs, especially those of Raja Ampat Islands. Following Tidore's defeat, much of the territory it claimed in western part of New Guinea came under Dutch rule as part of the Dutch East Indies.

Colonial era 
In 1511, Antonio d'Arbau, a Portuguese sailor, called the Papua region as "Os Papuas" or llha de Papo. Don Jorge de Menetes, a sailor from Spain also stopped by in Papua a few years later (1526–1527), he refers to the region as 'Papua', which was mentioned in the diary of Antonio Figafetta, the clerk for the Magellan voyage. The name Papua was known to Figafetta when he stopped on the island of Tidore.

On 16 May 1545, Yñigo Ortiz de Retez, a Spanish maritime explorer in command of the San Juan de Letran, left port in Tidore, a Spanish stronghold in the Maluku Islands and going by way of the Talaud Islands and the Schoutens, reached the northern coast of New Guinea, which was coasted till the end of August when, owing to the 5°S latitude, contrary winds and currents, forcing a return to Tidore arriving on 5 October 1545. Many islands were encountered and first charted, along the northern coast of New Guinea, and in the Padaidos, Le Maires, Ninigos, Kaniets and Hermits, to some of which Spanish names were given. On 20 June 1545 at the mouth of the Mamberamo River (charted as San Agustin) he took possession of the land for the Spanish Crown, in the process giving the island the name by which it is known today. He called it Nueva Guinea owing to the resemblance of the local inhabitants to the peoples of the Guinea coast in West Africa. The first map showing the whole island as an island was published in 1600 and shown 1606, Luís Vaz de Torres explored the southern coast of New Guinea from Milne Bay to the Gulf of Papua including Orangerie Bay, which he named Bahía de San Lorenzo. His expedition also discovered Basilaki Island, naming it Tierra de San Buenaventura, which he claimed for Spain in July 1606. On 18 October, his expedition reached the western part of the island in present-day Indonesia, and also claimed the territory for the King of Spain.

In 1606, a Duyfken expedition led by the commander Wiliam Jansen from Holland landed in Papua. This expedition consisted of 3 ships, where they sailed from the north coast of Java and stopped at the Kei Islands, at the southwestern coast of Papua. With the increasing Dutch grip in the region, the Spanish left New Guinea in 1663. In 1660, the Dutch recognized the Sultan of Tidore's sovereignty over New Guinea. New Guinea thus became notionally Dutch as the Dutch held power over Tidore.

Dutch New Guinea in the early 19th century was administered from the Moluccas. Although the coast had been mapped in 1825 by Lieutenant Commander D.H. Kolff, there had been no serious effort to establish a permanent presence in Dutch New Guinea. The British, however, had shown considerable interest in the area, and were threatening to settle it. To prevent this, the Governor of the Moluccas, Pieter Merkus, urged the Dutch government to establish posts along the coast. An administrative and trading post established in 1828 on Triton Bay on the southwest coast of New Guinea. On 24 August 1828, the birthday of King William I of the Netherlands, the Dutch flag was hoisted and the Dutch claimed all of Western New Guinea, which they called Nieuw Guinea Several native chieftains proclaimed their loyalty to the Netherlands. The post was named Fort Du Bus for the then-Governor General of the Dutch East Indies, Leonard du Bus de Gisignies. 30 years later, Germans established the first missionary settlement on an island near Manokwari. While in 1828 the Dutch claimed the south coast west of the 141st meridian and the north coast west of Humboldt Bay in 1848, they did not try to develop the region again until 1896; they established settlements in Manokwari and Fak-Fak in response to perceived Australian ownership claims from the eastern half of New Guinea. Great Britain and Germany had recognized the Dutch claims in treaties of 1885 and 1895. At the same time, Britain claimed south-east New Guinea, later as the Territory of Papua, and Germany claimed the northeast, later known as the Territory of New Guinea. The German, Dutch and British colonial administrators each attempted to suppress the still-widespread practices of inter-village warfare and headhunting within their respective territories. In 1901, the Netherlands formally purchased West New Guinea from the Sultanate of Tidore, incorporating it into the Netherlands East Indies.

Dutch activity in the region remained in the first half of the twentieth century, notwithstanding the 1923 establishment of the Nieuw Guinea Beweging (New Guinea Movement) in the Netherlands by ultra right-wing supporters calling for Dutchmen to create a tropical Netherlands in Papua. This pre-war movement without full government support was largely unsuccessful in its drive, but did coincide with the development of a plan for Eurasian settlement of the Dutch Indies to establish Dutch farms in northern West New Guinea. This effort also failed as most returned to Java disillusioned, and by 1938 just 50 settlers remained near Hollandia and 258 in Manokwari.  The Dutch established the Boven Digul camp in Tanahmerah, as a prison for Indonesian nationalists. Among those interned here were writer Marco Kartodikromo, Mohammad Hatta, who would become the first vice president of Indonesia, and Sutan Sjahrir, the first Indonesian Prime Minister.

Before about 1930, European maps showed the highlands as uninhabited forests. When first flown over by aircraft, numerous settlements with agricultural terraces and stockades were observed. The most startling discovery took place on 4 August 1938, when Richard Archbold discovered the Grand Valley of the Baliem River, which had 50,000 yet-undiscovered Stone Age farmers living in villages. The people, known as the Dani, were the last society of its size to make first contact with the rest of the world.

The region became important in World War II with the Pacific War upon the Netherlands' declaration of war on Japan after the bombing of Pearl Harbor. In 1942, the northern coast of West New Guinea and the nearby islands were occupied by Japan. By late 1942, most of the Netherlands Indies were occupied by Japan. Behind Japanese lines in New Guinea, Dutch guerrilla fighters resisted under Mauritz Christiaan Kokkelink. Allied forces drove out the Japanese after Operations Reckless and Persecution, with amphibious landings near Hollandia, from 21 April 1944. The area served as General Douglas MacArthur's headquarters until the conquest of the Philippines in March 1945. Over twenty U.S. bases were established and half a million US personnel moved through the area. West New Guinean farms supplied food for the half million US troops. Papuan men went into battle to carry the wounded, acted as guides and translators, and provided a range of services, from construction work and carpentry to serving as machine shop workers and mechanics. Following the end of the war, the Dutch retained possession of West New Guinea from 1945.

Preparing for independence 

In 1944, Jan van Eechoud set up a school for bureaucrats in Hollandia (now Jayapura). One early headmaster of the school was Soegoro Atmoprasojo, an Indonesian nationalist graduate of Taman Siswa and former Boven-Digoel prisoners, in one of these meetings the name "Irian" was suggested. Many of these school early graduates would go on to found Indonesian independence movement in Western New Guinea, while some went on to support Dutch authorities and pursue Papuan independence. In December 1945, Atmoprasojo alongside his students were planning for a rebellion, however Dutch authorities would be alerted by a defecting member of Papuan Battalion on 14 December 1945, utilising forces from Rabaul, Dutch authorities would also capture 250 people possibly involved in this attack. The news of Indonesian independence proclamation arrived in New Guinea primarily through shipping laborers associated with Sea Transport Union of Indonesia (Sarpelindo), who were working for ships under the flag of Australian and the Dutch. This led to the formation of the Komite Indonesia Merdeka or KIM branch in Abepura, Hollandia in October 1946, originally an organization for Indonesian exiles in Sydney. It was led by Dr. J.A. Gerungan, a woman doctor who led an Abepura hospital, by December 1946, it came to be led by Martin Indey. KIM was one of the first Indonesian nationalist groups in New Guinea, whose members were mostly former associates of Soegoro. Simultaneously another separate Indonesian nationalist movement in New Guinea formed when Dr. Sam Ratulangi, was exiled at Serui, along with his six staff by the Netherlands Indies Civil Administration on 5 July 1946. In exile he met with Silas Papare who was also exiled from a failed Pagoncang Alam led rebellion to free Atmoprasojo, on 29 November 1946, an organization called Indonesian Irian Independence Party (PKII) was formed. A year later, on 17 August 1947, former students of Soegoro and others would held a red and white flag-raising ceremony to commemorate the Indonesian independence day.

KIM and PKII members began to start movements in other areas of New Guinea, most of these were unsuccessful, and the perpetrators were either imprisoned or killed. In Manokwari, a movement called Red and White Movement (GMP) was founded, which was led by Petrus Walebong and Samuel D. Kawab. This movement later spread to Babo, Kokas, Fakfak, and Sorong. In Biak, a local branch of KIM was joined with Perserikatan Indonesia Merdeka (PIM) which was formed earlier in September 1945 under the leadership of Lukas Rumkorem. Lukas would be captured and exiled to Hollandia, with the charge he instigated violence among local population accused of trying to kill Frans Kaisiepo and Marcus Kaisiepo. Still the movement did not disappear in Biak, Stevanus Yoseph together with Petero Jandi, Terianus Simbiak, Honokh Rambrar, Petrus Kaiwai and Hermanus Rumere on 19 March 1948, instigate another revolt. Dutch authorities had to send reinforcements from Jayapura. The Dutch imposed a harder penalty, with capital punishment for Petro Jandi, and a life sentence to Stevanus Yoseph. Meanwhile, another organization was formed on the 17 August 1947, called the Association of Young Men of Indonesia (PPI) under the leadership of Abraham Koromath.

Around the Bomberai Peninsula area of Fakfak, specifically in Kokas, an Indonesian nationalist movement was led by Machmud Singgirei Rumagesan. On 1 March 1946, he ordered that all the Dutch's flags in Kokas to be changed into Indonesian flags. He was later imprisoned in Doom Island, Sorong, where he managed to recruit some followers as well as the support from local Sangaji Malan  Dutch authorities later aided by incoming troops from Sorong arrested the King Rumagesan and he was given capital punishment. Meanwhile, in Kaimana, King Muhammad Achmad Aituarauw founded an organization called Independence With Kaimana, West Irian (MBKIB), which similarly boycotted Dutch flags every 31 August. In response of this activity, Aituarauw was arrested by the Dutch and exiled to Ayamaru for 10 years in 1948. Other movements opposing the Dutch under local Papuan kings includes, New Guinea Islamic Union (KING) led by Ibrahim Bauw, King of Rumbati, Gerakan Pemuda Organisasi Muda led by Machmud Singgirei Rumagesan and Abbas Iha, and Persatuan Islam Kaimana (PIK) of Kaimana led by Usman Saad and King of Namatota, Umbair.

Following the Indonesian National Revolution, the Netherlands formally transferred sovereignty to the United States of Indonesia, on 27 December 1949. However, the Dutch refused to include Netherlands New Guinea in the new Indonesian Republic and took steps to prepare it for independence as a separate country. Following the failure of the Dutch and Indonesians to resolve their differences over West New Guinea during the Dutch-Indonesian Round Table Conference in late 1949, it was decided that the present status quo of the territory would be maintained and then negotiated bilaterally one year after the date of the transfer of sovereignty. However, both sides were still unable to resolve their differences in 1950, which led the Indonesian President Sukarno to accuse the Dutch of reneging on their promises to negotiate the handover of the territory. On 17 August 1950, Sukarno dissolved the United States of Indonesia and proclaimed the unitary Republic of Indonesia. Indonesia also began to initiate incursions to New Guinea in 1952, though most of these efforts would be unsuccessful. Most of these failed infiltrators would be sent to Boven-Digoel which would form clandestine intelligence groups working from the primarily southern part of New Guinea in preparation for war. Meanwhile, following the defeat of the third Afro-Asian resolution in November 1957, the Indonesian government embarked on a national campaign targeting Dutch interests in Indonesia; A total of 700 Dutch-owned companies with a valuation total of around $1.5 billion was nationalised. By January 1958, ten thousand Dutch nationals had left Indonesia, many returning to the Netherlands. By June 1960, around thirteen thousand Dutch nationals mostly Eurasians from New Guinea left for Australia, with around a thousand moving to the Netherlands. Following a sustained period of harassment against Dutch diplomatic representatives in Jakarta, the Indonesian government formally severed relations with the Netherlands in August 1960.

In response to Indonesian aggression, the Netherlands government stepped up its efforts to prepare the Papuan people for self-determination in 1959. These efforts culminated in the establishment of a hospital in Hollandia (modern–day Jayapura, currently Jayapura Regional General Hospital or RSUD Jayapura), a shipyard in Manokwari, agricultural research sites, plantations, and a military force known as the Papuan Volunteer Corps. By 1960, a legislative New Guinea Council had been established with a mixture of legislative, advisory and policy functions. Half of its members were to be elected, and elections for this council were held the following year. Most importantly, the Dutch also sought to create a sense of West Papuan national identity, and these efforts led to the creation of a national flag (the Morning Star flag), a national anthem, and a coat of arms. The Dutch had planned to transfer independence to West New Guinea in 1970.

Following the raising of the Papuan National Flag on 1 December 1961, tensions further escalated. Multiple rebellions erupted inside New Guinea against Dutch authorities, such as in Enarotali, Agats, Kokas, Merauke, Sorong and Baliem Valley. On 18 December 1961 Sukarno issued the Tri Komando Rakjat (People's Triple Command), calling the Indonesian people to defeat the formation of an independent state of West Papua, raise the Indonesian flag in the territory, and be ready for mobilisation at any time. In 1962 Indonesia launched a significant campaign of airborne and seaborne infiltrations against the disputed territory, beginning with a seaborne infiltration launched by Indonesian forces on 15 January 1962. The Indonesian attack was defeated by Dutch forces including the Dutch destroyers Evertsen and Kortenaer, the so-called Vlakke Hoek incident. Amongst the casualties was the Indonesian Deputy Chief of the Naval Staff; Commodore Yos Sudarso.

It finally was agreed through the New York Agreement in 1962 that the administration of Western New Guinea would be temporarily transferred from the Netherlands to Indonesia and that by 1969 the United Nations should oversee a referendum of the Papuan people, in which they would be given two options: to remain part of Indonesia or to become an independent nation. For a period of time, Dutch New Guinea were under the United Nations Temporary Executive Authority, before being transferred to Indonesia in 1963. A referendum was held in 1969, which was referred locally as Penantuan Pendapat Rakyat (Determination of the People's Opinion) or Act of Free Choice by independence activists. The referendum was recognized by the international community and the region became the Indonesian province of Irian Jaya. The province has been renamed as Papua since 2002.

Province of Indonesia 

Following the Act of Free Choice in 1969, Western New Guinea was formally integrated into the Republic of Indonesia. Instead of a referendum of the 816,000 Papuans, only 1,022 Papuan tribal representatives were allowed to vote, and they were coerced into voting in favor of integration. While several international observers including journalists and diplomats criticized the referendum as being rigged, the U.S. and Australia support Indonesia's efforts to secure acceptance in the United Nations for the pro-integration vote. That same year, 84 member states voted in favor for the United Nations to accept the result, with 30 others abstaining. Due to the Netherlands' efforts to promote a West Papuan national identity, a significant number of Papuans refused to accept the territory's integration into Indonesia. These formed the separatist Organisasi Papua Merdeka (Free Papua Movement) and have waged an insurgency against the Indonesian authorities, which continues to this day.

In January 2003 President Megawati Sukarnoputri signed an order dividing Papua into three provinces: Central Irian Jaya (Irian Jaya Tengah), Papua (or East Irian Jaya, Irian Jaya Timur), and West Papua (Irian Jaya Barat). The formality of installing a local government for Jakarta in Irian Jaya Barat (West) took place in February 2003 and a governor was appointed in November; a government for Irian Jaya Tengah (Central Irian Jaya) was delayed from August 2003 due to violent local protests. The creation of this separate Central Irian Jaya Province was blocked by Indonesian courts, who declared it to be unconstitutional and in contravention of the Papua's special autonomy agreement. The previous division into two provinces was allowed to stand as an established fact.

Following his election in 2014, Indonesian president, Joko Widodo, embarked on reforms intended to alleviate grievances of Native Papuans, such as stopping the transmigration program and starting massive infrastructure spending in Papua, including building Trans-Papua roads network. The Joko Widodo administration has prioritized infrastructure and human resource development as a great framework for solving the conflict in Papua. The administration has implemented a one-price fuel policy in Papua, with Jokowi assessing that it is a form of "justice" for all Papuans. The administration has also provided free primary and secondary education.

Security forces have been accused of abuses in the region including extrajudicial killings, torture, arrests of activists, and displacements of entire villages. On the other hand separatists have been accused and claimed much of the same violence, such as extrajudicial killings of both Papuan and non-Papuan civilians, torture, rapes, and attacking local villages. Protests against Indonesian rule in Papua happen frequently, the most recent being the 2019 Papua protests,  one of the largest and most violent, which include burning of mostly non-Papuan civilians and Papuans that did not want to join the rally.

In July 2022, regencies in central and southern Papua were separated from the province, to be created into three new provinces: South Papua administered from Merauke, Central Papua administered from Nabire, and Highlands Papua administered from Wamena.

Politics

Government 

The province of Papua is governed by a directly elected governor and a regional legislature, People's Representative Council of Papua (Dewan Perwakilan Rakyat Papua, abbreviated as DPRP or DPR Papua). A unique government organization in the province is the Papuan People's Assembly (Majelis Rakyat Papua), which was formed by the Indonesian government in 2005 as a coalition of Papuan tribal chiefs, tasked with arbitration and speaking on behalf of Papuan tribal customs. It is one of the only such institutions in the country, the other being West Papuan People's Assembly in West Papua province.

Since 2014, the DPRP has 55 members who are elected through General elections every five years and 14 people who are appointed through the special autonomy, bringing the total number of DPRP members to 69 people. The DPRP leadership consists of 1 Chairperson and 3 Deputy Chairmen who come from political parties that have the most seats and votes. The current DPRP members are the results of the 2019 General Election which was sworn in on 31 October 2019 by the Chairperson of the Jayapura High Court at the Papua DPR Building. The composition of DPRP members for the 2019–2024 period consists of 13 political parties where the Nasdem Party is the political party with the most seats, with 8 seats, followed by the Democratic Party which also won 8 seats and the Indonesian Democratic Party of Struggle which won 7 seats.

The province of Papua is one of six provinces to have obtained special autonomy status, the others being Aceh, West Papua, Central Papua, Highland Papua and South Papua (the Special Regions of Jakarta and Yogyakarta have a similar province-level special status). According to Law 21/2001 on Special Autonomy Status (UU Nomor 21 Tahun 2001 tentang Otonomi khusus Papua), the provincial government of Papua is provided with authority within all sectors of administration, except for the five strategic areas of foreign affairs, security and defense, monetary and fiscal affairs, religion and justice. The provincial government is authorized to issue local regulations to further stipulate the implementation of the special autonomy, including regulating the authority of districts and municipalities within the province. Due to its special autonomy status, Papua province is provided with significant amount of special autonomy funds, which can be used to benefit its indigenous peoples. But the province has low fiscal capacity and it is highly dependent on unconditional transfers and the above-mentioned special autonomy fund, which accounted for about 55% of total revenues in 2008.

After obtaining its special autonomy status, to allow the local population access to timber production benefits, the Papuan provincial government issued a number of decrees, enabling:
 a Timber Logging Permit for Customary Communities, which enabled local people to carry out timber extraction in small concessions (250 to 1,000 hectares) for one year through a community-based or participatory community cooperative;
 a Permit to Manage Customary Forests, which was a timber extraction permit for larger concessions (up to 2,000 hectares) for a maximum of 20 years;
 logging companies had to pay compensations to local communities in addition to all other fees and taxes collected by the national government.

Administrative divisions 

As of 2022 (following the separation of Central Papua, Highland Papua, and South Papua province), the residual Papua Province consisted of 8 regencies (kabupaten) and one city (kota); on the map below, these regencies comprise the northern belt from Waropen Regency to Keerom Regency, plus the island groups to their northwest. Initially the area now forming the present Papua Province contained three regencies - Jayapura, Yapen Waropen and Biak Numfor. The City of Jayapura was separated on 2 August 1993 from Jayapura Regency and formed into a province-level administration. On 11 December 2002 three new regencies were created - Keerom and Sarmi from parts of Jayapura Regency, and Waropen from part of Yapen Waropen Regency (the rest of this regency was renamed as Yapen Islands). On 18 December 2003 a further regency - Supiori - was created from part of Biak Numfor Regency, and on 15 March 2007 a further regency - Mamberamo Raya - was created from the western part of Sarmi Regency. These regencies and the city are together subdivided as into districts (distrik), and thence into "villages" (kelurahan and desa). With the release of the Act Number 21 of 2001 concerning the Special Autonomous Region of Papua Province, the term distrik was used instead of kecamatan in the entire Western New Guinea. The difference between the two is merely the terminology, with kepala distrik being the district head.

The regencies (kabupaten) and the city (kota) are listed below with their areas and their populations at the 2020 census and subsequent official estimates for mid 2022, together with the 2020 Human Development Index of each administrative divisions.

Environment

Geography and Climate 
The island of New Guinea lies to the east of the Malay Archipelago, with which it is sometimes included as part of a greater Indo-Australian Archipelago. Geologically it is a part of the same tectonic plate as Australia. When world sea levels were low, the two shared shorelines (which now lie 100 to 140 metres below sea level), and combined with lands now inundated into the tectonic continent of Sahul, also known as Greater Australia. The two landmasses became separated when the area now known as the Torres Strait flooded after the end of the Last Glacial Period.

The province of Papua is located between 2 ° 25'LU – 9 ° S and 130 ° – 141 ° East. The total area of Papua is now 82,680.95 km2 (31,923.29 sq. miles). Until its division in 2022 into four provinces, Papua Province was the province that had the largest area in Indonesia, with a total area of 312,816.35 km2, or 19.33% of the total area of the Indonesian archipelago. The boundaries of Papua are: Pacific Ocean (North), Highland Papua (South), Central Papua (Southwest) and Papua New Guinea (East). Papua, like most parts of Indonesia, has two seasons, the dry season and the rainy season. From June to September the wind flows from Australia and does not contain much water vapor resulting in a dry season. On the other hand, from December to March, the wind currents contain a lot of water vapor originating from Asia and the Pacific Ocean so that the rainy season occurs. The average temperature in Papua ranges from 19 °C to 28 °C and humidity is between 80% to 89%. The average annual rainfall is between 1,500 mm to 7,500 mm. Snowfalls sometime occurs in the mountainous areas of the province, especially the central highlands region.

The tree line is around  elevation and the tallest peaks contain permanent equatorial glaciers, increasingly melting due to a changing climate. Various other smaller mountain ranges occur both north and west of the central ranges. Except in high elevations, most areas possess a hot, humid climate throughout the year, with some seasonal variation associated with the northeast monsoon season.

Another major habitat feature is the vast southern and northern lowlands. Stretching for hundreds of kilometers, these include lowland rainforests, extensive wetlands, savanna grasslands, and some of the largest expanses of mangrove forest in the world. The southern lowlands are the site of Lorentz National Park, a UNESCO World Heritage Site. The northern lowlands are drained principally by the Mamberamo River and its tributaries on the western side, and by the Sepik on the eastern side. The more extensive southern lowlands, now in South Papua Province, are drained by a larger number of rivers, principally the Digul in the west and the Fly in the east. The largest island offshore, Dolak (also called Yos Sudarso), lies near the Digul estuary, separated by the narrow Muli Strait that is so narrow it has been named a "creek". The island is administered as part of the Merauke Regency.

The province's largest river is the Mamberamo located in the western part of the province. The result is a large area of lakes and rivers known as the Lakes Plains region. It is the highest peak of Oceania.

Ecology 
Anthropologically, New Guinea is considered part of Melanesia. Botanically, New Guinea is considered part of Malesia, a floristic region that extends from the Malay Peninsula across Indonesia to New Guinea and the East Melanesian Islands. The flora of New Guinea is a mixture of many tropical rainforest species with origins in Asia, together with typically Australasian flora. Typical Southern Hemisphere flora include the Conifers Podocarpus and the rainforest emergents Araucaria and Agathis, as well as Tree ferns and several species of Eucalyptus.

New Guinea is differentiated from its drier, flatter, and less fertile southern counterpart, Australia, by its much higher rainfall and its active volcanic geology. Yet the two land masses share a similar animal fauna, with marsupials, including wallabies and possums, and the egg-laying monotreme, the echidna. Other than bats and some two dozen indigenous rodent genera, there are no pre-human indigenous placental mammals. Pigs, several additional species of rats, and the ancestor of the New Guinea singing dog were introduced with human colonization.

The island has an estimated 16,000 species of plant, 124 genera of which are endemic. Papua's known forest fauna includes; marsupials (including possums, wallabies, tree-kangaroos, cuscuses); other mammals (including the endangered long-beaked echidna); bird species such as birds-of-paradise, cassowaries, parrots, and cockatoos; the world's longest lizards (Papua monitor); and the world's largest butterflies.

The waterways and wetlands of Papua are also home to salt and freshwater crocodile, tree monitors, flying foxes, osprey, bats and other animals; while the equatorial glacier fields remain largely unexplored.

Protected areas within Papua province include the World Heritage Lorentz National Park, and the Wasur National Park, a Ramsar wetland of international importance. Birdlife International has called Lorentz Park "probably the single most important reserve in New Guinea". It contains five of World Wildlife Fund's "Global 200" ecoregions: Southern New Guinea Lowland Forests; New Guinea Montane Forests; New Guinea Central Range Subalpine Grasslands; New Guinea mangroves; and New Guinea Rivers and Streams. Lorentz Park contains many unmapped and unexplored areas, and is certain to contain many species of plants and animals as yet unknown to Western science. Local communities' ethnobotanical and ethnozoological knowledge of the Lorentz biota is also very poorly documented. On the other hand, Wasur National Park has a very high value biodiversity has led to the park being dubbed the "Serengeti of Papua". About 70% of the total area of the park consists of savanna (see Trans-Fly savanna and grasslands), while the remaining vegetation is swamp forest, monsoon forest, coastal forest, bamboo forest, grassy plains and large stretches of sago swamp forest. The dominant plants include Mangroves, Terminalia, and Melaleuca species. The park provides habitat for a large variety of up to 358 bird species of which some 80 species are endemic to the island of New Guinea. Fish diversity is also high in the region with some 111 species found in the eco-region and a large number of these are recorded from Wasur. The park's wetland provides habitat for various species of lobster and crab as well.

Several parts of the province remains unexplored due to steep terrain, leaving a high possibility that there are still many undiscovered floras and faunas that is yet to be discovered. In February 2006, a team of scientists exploring the Foja Mountains, Sarmi, discovered new species of birds, butterflies, amphibians, and plants, including possibly the largest-flowered species of rhododendron. In December 2007, a second scientific expedition was taken to the mountain range. The expedition led to the discovery of two new species: the first being a 1.4 kg giant rat (Mallomys sp.) approximately five times the size of a regular brown rat, the second a pygmy possum (Cercartetus sp.) described by scientists as "one of the world's smallest marsupials." An expedition late in 2008, backed by the Indonesian Institute of Sciences, National Geographic Society and Smithsonian Institution, was made in order to assess the area's biodiversity.  New types of animals recorded include a frog with a long erectile nose, a large woolly rat, an imperial-pigeon with rust, grey and white plumage, a 25 cm gecko with claws rather than pads on its toes, and a small, 30 cm high, black forest wallaby (a member of the genus Dorcopsis).

Ecological threats include logging-induced deforestation, forest conversion for plantation agriculture (including oil palm), smallholder agricultural conversion, the introduction and potential spread of alien species such as the crab-eating macaque which preys on and competes with indigenous species, the illegal species trade, and water pollution from oil and mining operations.

Economy 
Papua is reported to be one of Indonesia's poorest regions. The province is rich in natural resources but has weaknesses namely in limited infrastructure and less skilled human resources. So far, Papua has had a fairly good economic development due to the support of economic sources, especially mining, forest, agriculture and fisheries products. Economic development has been uneven in Papua, and poverty in the region remains high by Indonesian standards. Part of the problem has been neglect of the poor—too little or the wrong kind of government support from Jakarta and Jayapura.  A major factor in this is the extraordinarily high cost of delivering goods and services to large numbers of isolated communities, in the absence of a developed road or river network (the latter in contrast to Kalimantan) providing access to the interior and the highlands. Intermittent political and military conflict and tight security controls have also contributed to the problem but with the exception of some border regions and a few pockets in the highlands, this has not been the main factor contributing to underdevelopment.

Papua's gross domestic product grew at a faster rate than the national average until, and throughout the financial crisis of 1997–98. However, the differences are much smaller if mining is excluded from the provincial GDP. Given that most mining revenues were commandeered by the central government until the Special Autonomy Law was passed in 2001, provincial GDP without mining is most likely a better measure of Papuan GDP during the pre- and immediate post-crisis periods. On a per capita basis, the GDP growth rates for both Papua and Indonesia are lower than those for total GDP. However, the gap between per capita GDP and total GDP is larger for Papua than for Indonesia as a whole, reflecting Papua's high population growth rates.

Although Papua has experienced almost no growth in GDP, the situation is not as serious as one might think. It is true that the mining sector, dominated by Freeport Indonesia, has been declining over the last decade or so, leading to a fall in the value of exports. On the other hand, government spending and fixed capital investment have both grown, by well over 10 per cent per year, contributing to growth in sectors such as finance, construction, transport and communications, and trade, hotels and restaurants. With so many sectors still experiencing respectable levels of growth, the impact of the stagnant economy on the welfare of the population will probably be limited. It should also be remembered that mining is typically an enclave activity; its impact on the general public is fairly limited, regardless of whether it is booming or contracting.

Papua has depended heavily on natural resources, especially the mining, oil and gas sectors, since the mid-1970s. Although this is still the case, there have been some structural changes in the two provincial economies since the split in 2003. The contribution of mining to the economy of Papua province declined from 62 per cent in 2003 to 47 per cent in 2012. The shares of agriculture and manufacturing also fell, but that of utilities remained the same. A few other sectors, notably construction and services, increased their shares during the period. Despite these structural changes, the economy of Papua province continues to be dominated by the mining sector, and in particular by a single company, Freeport indonesia.

Mining is still and remains one of the dominant economic sector in Papua. The Grasberg Mine, the world's largest gold mine and second-largest copper mine, is located in the highlands near Puncak Jaya, the highest mountain in Papua and whole Indonesia. Grasberg Mine producing 1.063 billion pounds of copper, 1.061 million ounces gold and 2.9 million ounces silver. It has 19,500 employees operated by PT Freeport Indonesia (PT-FI) which used to be 90.64% owned by Freeport-McMoran (FCX). In August 2017, FCX announced that it will divest its ownership in PT-FI so that Indonesia owns 51%. In return the CoW will be replaced by a special license (IUPK) with mining rights to 2041 and FCX will build a new smelter by 2022.

Besides mining, there are at least three other important economic sectors (excluding the government sector) in the Papuan economy. The first is agriculture, particularly food crops, forestry and fisheries.  Agriculture made up 10.4 per cent of provincial GDP in 2005 but grew at an average rate of only 0.1 per cent per annum in 2000–05. The second important sector is trade, hotels and restaurants, which contributed 4.0 per cent of provincial GDP in 2005. Within this sector, trade contributed most to provincial GDP. However, the subsector with the highest growth rate was hotels, which grew at 13.2 per cent per annum in 2000–05. The third important sector is transport and Communications, which contributed 3.4 per cent of provincial GDP in 2005. The sector grew at an average annual rate of 5.3 percent in 2000–05, slightly below the national level. Within the sector, sea transport, air transport and communications performed particularly well. The role of private enterprise in developing communications and air transport has become increasingly significant. Since private enterprise will only expand if businesspeople see good prospects to make a profit, this is certainly an encouraging development. At current rates of growth, the transport and communications sector could support the development of agriculture in Papua. However, so far, most of the growth in communications has been between the rapidly expanding urban areas of Jayapura, Timika, Merauke, and between them and the rest of Indonesia. Nevertheless, in the medium term, improved communication networks may create opportunities for Papua to shift from heavy dependence on the mining sector to greater reliance on the agricultural sector. With good international demand for palm oil anticipated in the medium term, production of this commodity could be expanded. However, the negative effects of deforestation on the local environment should be a major consideration in the selection of new areas for this and any other plantation crop. In 2011, Papuan caretaker governor Syamsul Arief Rivai claimed Papua's forests cover 42 million hectares with an estimated worth of Rp 700 trillion ($78 billion) and that if the forests were managed properly and sustainably, they could produce over 500 million cubic meters of logs per annum.

Manufacturing and banking make up a tiny proportion of the regional economy and experienced negative growth in 2000–05. Poor infrastructure and lack of human capital are the most likely reasons for the poor performance of manufacturing. In addition, the costs of manufacturing are typically very high in Papua, as they are in many other outer island regions of Indonesia. Both within Indonesia and in the world economy, Papua's comparative advantage will continue to lie in agriculture and natural resource-based industries for a long time to come. A more significant role for manufacturing is unlikely given the far lower cost of labor and better infrastructure in Java. But provided that there are substantial improvements in infrastructure and communications, over the longer term manufacturing can be expected to cluster around activities related to agriculture—for example, food processing.

Infrastructure 
Compared to other parts of Indonesia, the infrastructure in Papua is one of the most least developed, owing to its distance from the national capital Jakarta. Nevertheless, for the past few years, the central government has invested significant sums of money to build and improve the current infrastructure in the province. The infrastructure development efforts of the Ministry of Public Works and Housing in Papua have been very massive in the last 10 years. This effort is carried out to accelerate equitable development and support regional development in Papua. The main focus of infrastructure development in Papua is to improve regional connectivity, improve the quality of life through the provision of basic infrastructure and increase food security through the development of water resources infrastructure. The achievements and conditions of infrastructure development in Papua until 2017 have shown significant progress.

Energy and water resources 
Electricity distribution in the province as well as the whole country is operated and managed by the Perusahaan Listrik Negara (PLN). Originally, most Papuan villages do not have access to electricity. The Indonesia government through the Ministry of Energy and Mineral Resources, in the beginning of year 2016, introduced a program named "Indonesia Terang" or Bright Indonesia. The aimed of this program is to speed up Electrification Rate (ER) with priority to the six provinces at Eastern area of Indonesia including Papua Province. The target of Indonesian's ER by 2019 is 97%. While the Indonesian's national ER already high (88.30%) in 2015, Papua still the lowest ER (45.93%) among the provinces. The scenario to boost up ER in the Eastern area by connected the consumers at villages which not electrified yet to the new Renewable Energy sources.

The percentage of household that were connected to the electricity in Papua (Electrification ratio/ER) is the lowest one among the provinces in Indonesia. Data from the Ministry of Energy and Mineral Resources shows that only Papua Province has ER level below 50% (45.93%) with the national average RE was 88.30%. High ER of more than 85% can be found in the rest of west area of the country. The main reason of lowest RE in Papua is a huge area with landlocked and mountain situation and low density population. Energy consumption in residential sector, 457 GWh in year 2014, contributes the electrification rate in Papua Province. But again, geographic and demographic obstacle made the electrical energy not well dispersed in Papua. The ER level are usually higher in the coastal area but become low in the mountain area. The ongoing project of 35GW and Bright Indonesia proves that the government is focusing on improving electricity infrastructure in Papua. The target is 2.114 unelectrified villages in Papua and energy consumption each household will be 0.6 kWh/day. If they use Solar system to meet this consumption of energy, then each household should have been installed with at least 150 Wp solar home system (assuming the efficiency is 0.85 and minimum insulation is 5 hours/day). As of 2019, there are still 1,724 villages in Papua and West Papua that have not received electricity, mostly in the inland regions. Nevertheless, the Bright Indonesia program is considered to be a success, as more and more villages are receiving electricity for the first time.

All pipes water supply in the province is managed by the Papua Municipal Waterworks (Indonesian: Perusahaan Daerah Air Minum Papua – PDAM Papua ). The supply of clean water is one of the main problem faced by the province, especially during drought seasons. Papua has been named as the province with the worst sanitation in Indonesia, garnering a score of 45 while the national average is 75, due to unhealthy lifestyle habits and a lack of clean water. In response, the government has invested money to build the sufficient infrastructure to hold clean water. Several new dams are also being built by the government throughout the province.

Achieving universal access to drinking water, sanitation and hygiene is essential to accelerating progress in the fields of health, education and poverty alleviation. In 2015, about a quarter of the population used basic sanitation facilities at home, while a third still practiced open defecation. The coverage of improved drinking water sources is much higher, both in households and schools. Inequality based on income and residence levels is stark, demonstrating the importance of integrating equity principles into policy and practice and expanding the coverage of community-based total sanitation programs.

Internet and telecommunication 
Papua is the largest province in Indonesia, but it has the least amount of telecommunications services due to geographic isolation. The deployment of service to the district and to the sub district is still not evenly distributed. The distribution of telecommunication services in Papua is still very uneven. This is indicated by the percentage of the number of telecommunication services and infrastructure whose distribution is centralized in certain areas such as Jayapura. Based on data, the Human Development Index in Papua increases every year but is not accompanied by an increase adequate number of telecommunication facilities.

The Ministry of Communication and Information Technology through the Information Technology Accessibility Agency (BAKTI) has built around 9 base transceiver stations in remote areas of Papua, namely Puncak Jaya Regency and Mamberamo Raya Regency, to connect to internet access. In the early stages, the internet was prioritized to support the continuity of education, health and better public services. To realize connectivity in accordance with government priorities, the Ministry of Communication and Information is determined to reach all districts in the Papua region with high-speed internet networks by 2020. It is planned that all districts in Papua and West Papua will build a fast internet backbone network. There are 31 regencies that have new high-speed internet access to be built.

In late 2019, the government announced the completion of the Palapa Ring project – a priority infrastructure project that aimed to provide access to 4G internet services to more than 500 regencies across Indonesia, Papua included. The project is estimated to have cost US$1.5 billion and comprises 35,000 km (21,747 miles) of undersea fiber-optic cables and 21,000 km (13,000 miles) of land cables, stretching from the westernmost city in Indonesia, Sabang to the easternmost town, Merauke, which is located in Papua. Additionally, the cables also transverse every district from the northernmost island Miangas to the southernmost island, Rote. Through the Palapa Ring, the government can facilitate a network capacity of up to 100 Gbit/s in even the most outlying regions of the country.

Transportation

Land 

So far, air routes have been a mainstay in Papua and West Papua provinces as a means of transporting people and goods, including basic necessities, due to inadequate road infrastructure conditions. This has resulted in high distribution costs which have also increased the prices of various staple goods, especially in rural areas. Therefore, the government is trying to reduce distribution costs by building the Trans-Papua Highway. As of 2016, the Trans-Papua highway that has been connected has reached 3,498 kilometers, with asphalt roads for 2,075 kilometers, while the rest are still dirt roads, and roads that have not been connected have reached 827 km. The development of the Trans-Papua highway will create connectivity between regions so that it can have an impact on the acceleration of economic growth in Papua and West Papua in the long term. Apart from the construction of the Trans-Papua highway, the government is also preparing for the first railway development project in Papua, which is currently entering the feasibility study phase. The said infrastructure funding for Papua is not insignificant. The need to connect all roads in Papua and West Papua is estimated at Rp. 12.5 trillion (US$870 million). In the 2016 State Budget, the government has also budgeted an additional infrastructure development fund of Rp. 1.8 trillion (US$126 million).

Data from the Ministry of Public Works and Housing (KPUPR) states, the length of the Trans-Papua highway in Papua reaches 2,902 km. These include Merauke-Tanahmerah-Waropko (543 km), Waropko-Oksibil (136 km), Dekai-Oksibil (225 km), and Kenyam-Dekai (180 km). Then, Wamena-Habema-Kenyam-Mamug (295 km), Jayapura-Elelim-Wamena (585 km), Wamena-Mulia-Ilaga-Enarotali (466 km), Wagete-Timika (196 km), and Enarotali-Wagete-Nabire (285 km). As of 2020, only about 200–300 kilometers of the Trans-Papua highwat have not been connected.

As in other provinces in Indonesia, Papua uses a dual carriageway with the left-hand traffic rule, and cities and towns such as Jayapura and Merauke provide public transportation services such as buses and taxis along with Gojek and Grab services. Currently, the Youtefa Bridge in Jayapura is the longest bridge in the province, with a total length of 732 metres (2,402 ft). The bridge cut the distance and travel time from Jayapura city center to Muara Tami district as well as Skouw State Border Post at Indonesia–Papua New Guinea border. The bridge construction was carried out by consortium of state-owned construction companies PT Pembangunan Perumahan Tbk, PT Hutama Karya (Persero), and PT Nindya Karya (Persero), with a total construction cost of IDR 1.87 trillion and support from the Ministry of Public Works and Housing worth IDR 1.3 trillion. The main span assembly of the Youtefa Bridge was not carried out at the bridge site, but at PAL Indonesia shipyard in Surabaya, East Java. Its production in Surabaya aims to improve safety aspects, improve welding quality, and speed up the implementation time to 3 months. This is the first time where the arch bridge is made elsewhere and then brought to the location. From Surabaya the bridge span, weighing 2000 tons and 112.5 m long, was sent by ship with a 3,200 kilometers journey in 19 days. Installation of the first span was carried out on 21 February 2018, while the second span was installed on 15 March 2018 with an installation time of approximately 6 hours. The bridge was inaugurated on 28 October 2019 by President Joko Widodo.

A railway with a length of 205 km is being planned, which would connect the provincial capital Jayapura and Sarmi to the east. Further plans include connecting the railway to Sorong and Manokwari in West Papua. In total, the railway would have a length of 595 km, forming part of the Trans-Papua Railway. Construction of the railway is still in the planning stage. A Light Rapid Transport (LRT) connecting Jayapura and Sentani is also being planned.

Air 

The geographical conditions of Papua which are hilly and have dense forests and do not have adequate road infrastructure, such as in Java or Sumatra, make transportation a major obstacle for local communities. Air transportation using airplanes is by far the most effective means of transportation and is needed most by the inhabitants of the island, although it is not cheap for it. A number of airlines are also scrambling to take advantage of the geographical conditions of the island by opening busy routes to and from a number of cities, both district and provincial capitals. If seen from the sufficient condition of the airport infrastructure, there are not a few airports that can be landed by jets like Boeing and Airbus as well as propeller planes such as ATR and Cessna.

Sentani International Airport in Jayapura is the largest airport in the province, serving as the main gateway to the province from other parts of Indonesia. The air traffic is roughly divided between flights connecting to destinations within the Papua province and flights linking Papua to other parts of Indonesia. The airport connects Jayapura with other Indonesian cities such as Manado, Makassar, Surabaya and Jakarta, as well as towns within the province such as Biak, Timika and Merauke. Sentani International Airport is also the main base for several aviation organizations, including Associated Mission Aviation, Mission Aviation Fellowship, YAJASI and Tariku Aviation. The airport currently does not have any international flights, although there are plans to open new airline routes to neighboring Papua New Guinea in the future. Other medium-sized airports in the province are Mozes Kilangin Airport in Timika, Mopah International Airport in Merauke, Frans Kaisiepo International Airport in Biak, and Wamena Airport in Wamena. There are over 300 documented airstrips in Papua, consisting of mostly small airstrips that can only be landed by small airplanes. The government is planning to open more airports in the future to connect isolated regions in the province.

Water 
Water transportation, which includes sea and river transportation, is also one of the most crucial form of transportation in the province, after air transportation. The number of passengers departing by sea in Papua in October 2019 decreased by 16.03 percent, from 18,785 people in September 2019 to 15,773 people. The number of passengers arriving by sea in October 2019 decreased by 12.32 percent, from 11,108 people in September 2019 to 9,739 people. The volume of goods loaded in October 2019 was recorded at 17,043 tons, an increase of 30.57 percent compared to the volume in September 2019 which amounted to 13,053 tons. The volume of goods unloaded in October 2019 was recorded at 117,906 tons or a decrease of 2.03 percent compared to the volume in September 2019 which amounted to 120,349 tons.

There are several ports in the province, with the Port of Depapre in Jayapura being the largest, which started operation in 2021. There are also small to medium-sized ports in Biak, Timika, Merauke and Agats, which serves passenger and cargo ships within the province, as well as from other Indonesian provinces.

Healthcare 
Health-related matters in the Papua is administered by the Papua Provincial Health Agency (Indonesian: Dinas Kesehatan Provinsi Papua). According to the Indonesian Central Agency on Statistics, as of 2015, there are around 13,554 hospitals in Papua which consists of 226 state-owned hospitals and 13,328 private hospitals. Furthermore, there are 394 clinics spread throughout the province. The most prominent hospital is the Papua Regional General Hospital (Indonesian: Rumah Sakit Umum Daerah Papua) in Jayapura, which is the largest state-owned hospital in the province.

Papua is reported to have the highest rates of child mortality and HIV/AIDS in Indonesia. Lack of good healthcare infrastructure is one of the main issues in Papua as of today, especially in the remote regions, as most hospitals that have adequate facilities are only located at major cities and towns. A measles outbreak and famine killed at least 72 people in Asmat regency in early 2018, during which 652 children were affected by measles and 223 suffered from malnutrition.

Education 

Education in Papua, as well as Indonesia in a whole, falls under the responsibility of the Ministry of Education and Culture (Kementerian Pendidikan dan Kebudayaan or Kemdikbud) and the Ministry of Religious Affairs (Kementerian Agama or Kemenag). In Indonesia, all citizens must undertake twelve years of compulsory education which consists of six years at elementary level and three each at middle and high school levels. Islamic schools are under the responsibility of the Ministry of Religious Affairs. The Constitution also notes that there are two types of education in Indonesia: formal and non-formal. Formal education is further divided into three levels: primary, secondary and tertiary education. Indonesians are required to attend 12 years of school, which consists of three years of primary school, three years of secondary school and three years of high school.

As of 2015, there are 3 public universities and 40 private universities in Papua. Public universities in Papua fall under the responsibility of the Ministry of Research and Technology (Kementerian Riset dan Teknologi) as well as the Ministry of Education and Culture. The most famous university in the province is the Cenderawasih University in Jayapura. The university has faculties in economics, law, teacher training and education, medical, engineering, and social and political science. Until 2002 the university had a faculty of agricultural sciences at Manokwari, which was then separated to form the Universitas Negeri Papua.

Demographics 
While the Papuan branch of the Central Agency on Statistics had earlier projected the 2020 population of the province to be 3,435,430 people the actual Census in 2020 revealed a total population of 4,303,707, spread throughout 28 regencies and 1 administrative city. The city of Jayapura is the most populated administrative division in the province, with a total of 398,478 people in 2020, while Supiori Regency, which comprises mainly the island of Supiori, one of the Schouten Islands within Cenderawasih Bay off the north coast of Papua, is the least populated administrative division in the province, with just 22,547 people. Most of the population in the province are concentrated in coastal regions, especially around the city of Jayapura and its suburbs. Papua is also home to many migrants from other parts of Indonesia, of which an overwhelming percentage of these migrants came as part of a government-sponsored transmigration program. The transmigration program in Papua was only formally halted by President Joko Widodo in June 2015.

Ethnicity 

In contrast to other Indonesian provinces, which are mostly dominated by Austronesian peoples, Papua and West Papua as well as some part of Maluku are home to the Melanesians. The indigenous Papuans which are part of the Melanesians forms the majority of the population in the province. Many believe human habitation on the island dates to as early as 50,000 BC, and first settlement possibly dating back to 60,000 years ago has been proposed. The island of New Guinea is presently populated by almost a thousand different tribal groups and a near-equivalent number of separate languages, which makes it the most linguistically diverse area in the world. Current evidence indicates that the Papuans (who constitute the majority of the island's peoples) are descended from the earliest human inhabitants of New Guinea. These original inhabitants first arrived in New Guinea at a time (either side of the Last Glacial Maximum, approx 21,000 years ago) when the island was connected to the Australian continent via a land bridge, forming the landmass of Sahul. These peoples had made the (shortened) sea-crossing from the islands of Wallacea and Sundaland (the present Malay Archipelago) by at least 40,000 years ago.

The ancestral Austronesian peoples are believed to have arrived considerably later, approximately 3,500 years ago, as part of a gradual seafaring migration from Southeast Asia, possibly originating in Taiwan. Austronesian-speaking peoples colonized many of the offshore islands to the north and east of New Guinea, such as New Ireland and New Britain, with settlements also on the coastal fringes of the main island in places. Human habitation of New Guinea over tens of thousands of years has led to a great deal of diversity, which was further increased by the later arrival of the Austronesians and the more recent history of European and Asian settlement.

Papuan is also home to ethnic groups from other part of Indonesia, including the Javanese, Sundanese, Balinese, Batak, etc. Most of these migrants came as part of the transmigration program, which was an initiative of the Dutch colonial government and later continued by the Indonesian government to move landless people from densely populated areas of Indonesia to less populous areas of the country. The program was accused of fuelling marginalisation and discrimination of Papuans by migrants, and causing fears of the "Javanisation" or "Islamisation" of Papua. There is open conflict between migrants, the state, and indigenous groups due to differences in culture—particularly in administration, and cultural topics such as nudity, food and sex. The transmigration program in Papua was stopped in 2015 due to the controversies it had caused.

Language 

Papua, the easternmost region of the Indonesian archipelago, exhibits a very complex linguistic network. The diversity of languages and the situation of multilingualism is very real. There are many language families scattered in this wide area, namely the Austronesian language family and numerous non-Austronesian languages known collectively as Papuan languages. Speakers of different Austronesian languages are found in coastal communities, such as Biak, Wandamen, Waropen and Ma'ya. On the other hand, Papuan languages are spoken in the interior and Central Highlands, starting from the Bird's Head Peninsula in the west to the eastern tip of the island of New Guinea, for example Meybrat, Dani, Ekari, Asmat, Muyu and Sentani language.

At this time, research efforts to find out how many indigenous languages in Papua are still being pursued. Important efforts regarding documentation and inventory of languages in Papua have also been carried out by two main agencies, namely SIL International and the Language and Book Development Agency in Jakarta. The results of the research that have been published by the two institutions show that there are differences in the number of regional languages in Papua. The Language and Book Development Agency as the official Indonesian government agency has announced or published that there are 207 different regional languages in Papua, while SIL International has stated that there are 271 regional languages in the region. Some of the regional languages of Papua are spoken by a large number of speakers and a wide spread area, some are supported by a small number of speakers and are scattered in a limited environment. However, until now it is estimated that there are still a number of regional languages in Papua that have not been properly studied so that it is not known what the form of the language is. In addition to local languages that have been listed by the two main institutions above, there are also dozens more languages from other islands due to population migration that is not included in the list of local languages in Papua, for example languages from Sulawesi (Bugis, Makassar, Toraja, Minahasa), Javanese from Java, and local languages from Maluku. So-called Papuan languages comprise hundreds of different languages, most of which are not related.

As in other provinces, Indonesian is the official language of the state, as well as the province. Indonesian is used in inter-ethnic communication, usually between native Papuans and non-Papuan migrants who came from other parts of Indonesia. Most formal education, and nearly all national mass media, governance, administration, judiciary, and other forms of communication in Papua, are conducted in Indonesian. A Malay-based creole language called Papuan Malay is used as the lingua franca in the province. It emerged as a contact language among tribes in Indonesian New Guinea for trading and daily communication. Nowadays, it has a growing number of native speakers. More recently, the vernacular of Indonesian Papuans has been influenced by Standard Indonesian, the national standard dialect. Some linguists have suggested that Papuan Malay has its roots in North Moluccan Malay, as evidenced by the number of Ternate loanwords in its lexicon. Others have proposed that it is derived from Ambonese Malay. A large number of local languages are spoken in the province, and the need for a common lingua franca has been underlined by the centuries-old traditions of inter-group interaction in the form of slave-hunting, adoption, and intermarriage. It is likely that Malay was first introduced by the Biak people, who had contacts with the Sultanate of Tidore, and later, in the 19th century, by traders from China and South Sulawesi. However, Malay was probably not widespread until the adoption of the language by the Dutch missionaries who arrived in the early 20th century and were then followed in this practice by the Dutch administrators. There are four varieties of Papuan Malay that can be identified, including Serui Malay. A variety of Papuan Malay is spoken in Vanimo, Papua New Guinea near the Indonesian border.

Religion

According to Indonesian Citizenship and Civil Registry in 2022, 70.15% of the Papuans identified themselves as Christians, with 64.68% being Protestants and 5.47% being Catholics. 29.56% of the population are Muslims and less than 1% were Buddhists or Hindus. There is also substantial practice of animism, the traditional religion for many Papuans, with many blending animistic beliefs with other religions such as Christianity and Islam. Christianity, including Protestantism and Roman Catholic are mostly adhered by native Papuans and migrants from Maluku, East Nusa Tenggara, North Sulawesi and Bataks of North Sumatra. Islam are mostly adhered by migrants from North Maluku, South Sulawesi (except Torajans), western Indonesia, and some native Papuans. Lastly Hinduism and Buddhism are mostly adhered by Balinese migrants and Chinese-Indonesians respectively.

Islam had been present in Papua since the 15th century, because of interaction with Muslim traders and Moluccan Muslim Sultanates especially the earliest being Bacan. Though there were many earlier theories and folk legends on origin of Islam, sometimes mixed with indigenous folk religion of Fakfak, Kaimana, Bintuni, and Wondama. These include Islamic procession of Hajj pilgrimage that do not go to Meccah, but to Nabi Mountain, near Arguni Bay and Wondama Bay. According to Aceh origins, a Samudra Pasai figure called Tuan Syekh Iskandar Syah was sent to Mesia (Kokas) to preach in Nuu War (Papua), he converted a Papuan called Kriskris by teaching him about Alif Lam Ha (Allah) and Mim Ha Mim Dal (Muhammad), he became Imam and first king of Patipi, Fakfak. Syekh Iskandar brought with him some religious texts, which were copied onto Koba-Koba leaves and wood barks. Syekh Iskandar would return to Aceh bringing the original manuscripts, but before that he would visit Moluccas specifically in Sinisore village. This corresponds with the village's origin of Islam that instead came from Papua. A study by Fakfak government, mentioned another Acehnese figure called Abdul Ghafar who visited Old Fatagar in 1502 under the reign of Rumbati King Mansmamor. He would preach in Onin language (lingua franca of the area at the time) and was buried next to village mosque in Rumbati, Patipi Bay, Fakfak. Based on family account of Abdullah Arfan, the dynasty of Salawati Kingdom, in the 16th century the first Papuan Muslim was Kalewan who married Siti Hawa Farouk, a muballighah from Cirebon, and changed his name to Bayajid who became the ancestor of Arfan clan. Meanwhile, based on oral history of Fakfak and Kaimana, a Sufi by the name of Syarif Muaz al-Qathan from Yaman constructed a mosque in Tunasgain, which was dated using the 8 merbau woods previously used as ceremonial Alif poles for the mosque around every 50 years, to be from 1587. He was also attributed of converting Samay, an Adi Ruler of the royal line of Sran. Islam only grew in the coastal part of Papua especially in the bird head areas, and did not spread to the interior part of the island until Dutch started sending migrants in 1902 and exiled Indonesian leaders in 1910 to Merauke. Muhammadiyah figures were exiled in Papua and in their exile help spread Islam in the region. Later on to help members with education issues, Muhammadiyah only formally sent its teacher in 1933. Islam in the interior highland only spread after 1962, after interaction with teachers and migrants as was the case of Jayawijaya and the case of Dani tribe of Megapura. While in Wamena, conversion of Walesi village in 1977 was attributed to Jamaludin Iribaram, a Papuan teacher from Fakfak. Other smaller indigenous Islamic communities can also be found in Asmat, Yapen, Waropen, Biak, Jayapura, and Manowari.

Missionaries Carl Ottow and Johann Geisler, under the initiative of Ottho Gerhard Heldring and permission from Tidore Sultanate, are the first Christian missionaries that reached Papua. They entered Papua at Mansinam Island, near Manokwari on 5 February 1855. Since 2001, the fifth of February has been a Papuan public holiday, recognizing this first landing. In 1863, sponsored by the Dutch colonial government, the Utrecht Mission Society (UZV) started a Christian-based education system as well as regular church services in Western New Guinea. Initially the Papuans' attendance was encouraged using bribes of betel nut and tobacco, but subsequently this was stopped. In addition, slaves were bought to be raised as step children and then freed. By 1880, only 20 Papuans had been baptized, including many freed slaves. The Dutch government established posts in Netherlands New Guinea in 1898, a move welcomed by the missionaries, who saw orderly Dutch rule as the essential antidote to Papua paganism. Subsequently, the UZV mission had more success, with a mass conversion near Cenderawasih Bay in 1907 and the evangelization of the Sentani people by Pamai, a native Papuan in the late 1920s. Due to the Great Depression, the mission suffered a funding shortfall, and switched to native evangelists, who had the advantage of speaking the local language (rather than Malay), but were often poorly trained. The mission extended in the 1930s to Yos Sudarso Bay, and the UZV mission by 1934 had over 50,000 Christians, 90% of them in North Papua, the remainder in West Papua. By 1942 the mission had expanded to 300 schools in 300 congregations. The first Catholic presence in Papua was in Fakfak, a Jesuit mission in 1894. In 1902 the Vicariate of Netherlands New Guinea was established. Despite the earlier activity in Fakfak, the Dutch restricted the Catholic Church to the southern part of the island, where they were active especially around Merauke. The mission campaigned against promiscuity and the destructive practices of headhunting among the Marind-anim. Following the 1918 flu pandemic, which killed one in five in the area, the Dutch government agreed to the establishment of model villages, based on European conditions, including wearing European clothes, but which the people would submit to only by violence. In 1925 the Catholics sought to re-establish their mission in Fakfak; permission was granted in 1927. This brought the Catholics into conflict with the Protestants in North Papua, who suggested expanding to South Papua in retaliation.

Culture 

The native Papuan people has a distinct culture and traditions that cannot be found in other parts of Indonesia. Coastal Papuans are usually more willing to accept modern influence into their daily lives, which in turn diminishes their original culture and traditions. Meanwhile, most inland Papuans still preserves their original culture and traditions, although their way of life over the past century are tied to the encroachment of modernity and globalization. Each Papuan tribe usually practices their own tradition and culture, which may differ greatly from one tribe to another.

The Ararem tradition is the tradition of delivering the dowry of a future husband to the family of the prospective wife in the Biak custom. In the Biak language, the word "Ararem" means dowry. In this procession, the bride and groom will be escorted on foot in a procession, accompanied by songs and dances accompanied by music and. The amount of the dowry is determined by the woman's family as agreed by her relatives. The date of submission of the dowry must be agreed upon by the family of the woman or the family of the prospective wife and the family of the man or family of the prospective husband. In the tradition of the Biak people, the payment of the dowry is a tradition that must be obeyed because it involves the consequences of a marriage.

Arts and performance 

There are a lot of traditional dances that are native to the province of Papua. Each Papuan tribe would usually have their own unique traditional dances.

The Yospan dance (Indonesian: Tarian Yospan) is a type of social association dance in Papua which is a traditional dance originating from the coastal regions of Papua, namely Biak, Yapen and Waropen, which are often played by the younger people as a form of friendship. Initially, the Yospan dance originated from two dances called Yosim and Pancar, which were eventually combined into one. Hence, Yospan is an acronym of Yosim and Pancar. When performing the Yosim dance, which originated from Yapen and Waropen, the dancers invited other residents to be immersed in the songs sung by a group of singers and music instrument holders. The musical instruments used are simple, which consists of ukulele and guitar, musical instruments that are not native to Papua. There is also a tool that functions as a bass with three ropes. The rope is usually made from rolled fibers, a type of pandanus leaf, which can be found in the forests of the coastal areas of Papua. A music instrument called Kalabasa is also played during the dance, it is made of dried pumpkin, then filled with beads or small stones that are played by simply shaking it. The women dancers wear woven sarongs to cover their chests, decorative heads with flowers and bird feathers. Meanwhile, the male dancers would usually wear shorts, open chest, head also decorated with bird feathers. The Pancar dance that originated from Biak is only accompanied by a tifa, which is the traditional musical instrument of the coastal tribes in Papua.

The Isosolo dance is a type of dance performed by the inhabitants who lives around Lake Sentani in Jayapura. The Isosolo dance is performed to symbolize the harmony between different tribes in Papua. The art of boat dancing is a tradition of the Papuan people, especially among the Sentani people, where the dance is performed from one village to another. According to the Sentani language, Isosolo or Isolo dance is a traditional art of the Sentani people who dance on a boat on Lake Sentani. The word Isosolo consists of two words, iso and solo (or holo). Iso means to rejoice and dance to express feelings of the heart, while holo means a group or herd from all age groups who dance. Hence, isosolo means a group of people who dance with joy to express their feelings. The Isosolo dance in Sentani is usually performed by ondofolo (traditional leaders) and the village community to present a gift to other ondofolo. Items that are offered are items that are considered valuable, such as large wild boar, garden products, delivering ondofolo girls to be married, and several other traditional gifts. However, at this time, apart from being a form of respect for ondoafi, isosolo is considered more as a performance of the Sentani people's pride which is one of the popular attractions at the Lake Sentani Festival, which is held annually.

Each Papuan tribe usually has their own war dance. The Papuan war dance is one of the oldest dances of the Papuan people because this classical dance has been around for thousands of years and is even one of the legacies of Indonesia's prehistoric times. In Papuan culture, this dance is a symbol of how strong and brave the Papuan people are. Allegedly, this dance was once a part of traditional ceremonies when fighting other tribes.

Another traditional dance that is common to most if not all Papuan tribes is called musyoh. The emergence of the musyoh dance is based on a certain history. In ancient times, when a Papuan tribe member died due to an accident or something unexpected, the Papuan people believed that the spirit of the person who died was still roaming and unsettled. To overcome this, the Papuan tribesmen created a ritual in the form of the musyoh dance. Thus, this traditional dance is often referred to as a spirit exorcism dance. Generally, the musyoh dance is performed by men. However, besides the purpose of exorcising spirits, the musyoh dance is also used by the Papuan people for another purpose, such as welcoming guests. The musyoh dance is a symbol of respect, gratitude, and an expression of happiness in welcoming guests. If it is for the purpose of expelling the spirit, this musyoh dance is performed by men. In the case for welcoming guests, this dance is performed by men and women. The costumes worn by the dancers can be said to be very simple costumes. This simplicity can be seen from its very natural ingredients, namely processed tree bark and plant roots. The material is then used as a head covering, tops and bottoms, bracelets and necklaces. There are also unique scribbles on the dancers' bodies that show the uniqueness of the dance.

Architecture 

The kariwari is one of the traditional Papuan houses, more precisely the traditional house of the Tobati-Enggros people who live around Yotefa Bay and Lake Sentani near Jayapura. Unlike other forms of Papuan traditional houses, such as the round honai, the kariwari is usually constructed in the shape of an octagonal pyramid. Kariwari are usually made of, bamboo, iron wood and forest sago leaves. The Kariwari house consists of two floors and three rooms or three rooms, each with different functions. The kariwari is not like a honai that can be lived in by anyone, it cannot even be the residence of a tribal chief – unlike the honai which has political and legal functions. The kariwari is more specific as a place of education and worship, therefore the position of the Kariwari in the community of the Tobati-Enggros people is considered a sacred and holy place. Like traditional houses in general, the kariwari also has a design that is full of decorative details that make it unique, of course, the decorations are related to Papuan culture. especially from the Tobati-Enggros. The decorations found in the kariwari  are usually in the form of works of art, among others; paintings, carvings and also sculptures. Apart from being decorated with works of art, the kariwari is also decorated with various weapons, such as; bow and arrow. There are also some skeletons of prey animals, usually in the form of wild boar fangs, kangaroo skeletons, turtle or turtle shells, birds-of-paradise, and so on.

Rumsram is the traditional house of the Biak Numfor people on the northern coast of Papua. This house was originally intended for men, while women were prohibited from entering or approaching it. Its function is similar to the kariwari, namely as a place for activities in teaching and educating men who are starting to be teenagers, in seeking life experiences. The building is square with a roof in the shape of an upside down boat because of the background of the Biak Numfor tribe who work as sailors. The materials used are bark for floors, split and chopped water bamboo for walls, while the roof is made of dried sago leaves. The walls are made of sago leaves. The original rumsram wall only had a few windows and its position was at the front and back. A rumsram usually has a height of approximately 6–8 m and is divided into two parts, differentiated by floor levels. The first floor is open and without walls. Only the building columns were visible. In this place, men are educated to learn sculpting, shielding, boat building, and war techniques. In a traditional ceremony called Wor Kapanaknik, which in the Biak language means "to shave a child's hair", a traditional ritual is usually carried out when boys are 6–8 years old. The age when a child is considered to be able to think and the child has started to get education in the search for life experiences, as well as how to become a strong and responsible man as the head of the family later. The children would then enter a rumsram, hence the rite of passage is also called rumsram, because the ritual are carried out in the rumsram.

Traditional weapons 

The cuscus bone skewer is a traditional Papuan weapon used by one of the indigenous Papuan tribes, namely the Bauzi people. The Bauzi people still maintains their tradition of hunting and gathering. The weapon they use to hunt animals while waiting for the harvest to arrive is a piercing tool made of cuscus bones. The use of cuscus bones as a traditional weapon is very environmentally friendly. This happens because in its manufacture, it does not require the help of industrial equipment that pollutes the environment. This traditional weapon is made from cleaned cuscus bone (before the meat is eaten and separated from the bone), sharpened by rubbing it with a whetstone, and repeated so that the desired sharpness is formed.

Papuan knife blades are usually used for slashing or cutting when hunting animals in the forest. Even though the animals they face are large mammals and crocodiles, the Papuan people still adhere to prevailing customs. The custom is that it is not permissible to use any kind of firearm when hunting. Papuan Daggers are knives made of unique materials and are difficult to obtain in other areas, namely the bones of an endemic animal to Papua, the cassowary. Cassowary bones are used by local culture to become a tool that has beneficial values for life. Apart from that, the feathers attached to the blade's handle are also the feathers of the cassowary.

The Papuan spear is referred to by the local community of Sentani as Mensa. The spear was a weapon that could be used for both fighting and hunting. In addition, Papuan culture often uses the spear as a property in dances. The weapons mentioned above are made from basic materials that are easily found in nature. Wood to make the handle, and a river stone that was sharpened as a spearhead. For that reason, the spear is able to survive as a weapon that must be present in hunting and fighting activities. What makes this traditional Papuan weapon feel special is that there is a rule not to use a spear other than for hunting and fighting purposes. For example, it is forbidden to cut young tree shoots with a spear, or to use a spear to carry garden produce. If this rule was broken, the person who wielded this spear would have bad luck. Meanwhile, in the manufacturing process, this spear frame takes a long time. Starting from the wood taken from the tree kayu swang with the diameter of 25 cm. After drying it in the sun, the wood is split to four and shaped so it has rounded cross-section, then the tip is shaped until it formed two-sided and leaf shaped spear-tip.

The bow and arrow is a traditional Papuan weapon locally in Sentani called Fela that has uses for hunting wild boar and other animals. The arrowheads is made from bark of sago tree, the bow is made from a type of wild betel nut tree which can also be made the arrowheads, the shaft is made from a type of grass, small sized bamboo which do not have cavity and rattan as the bowstring. Depending on the phase of for battle there are variety of arrow type, Hiruan is a plain sharp arrow with no decoration to lure the enemy; Humbai is a sharp arrow which have one serrated sided tip and the other plain, used to shoot seen enemy that is getting closer; Hube is an arrow with both sides serrated, used for enemy that is getting closer still; Humame is an arrow with three sided serrated tip, used for a really close enemy; Hukeli is an arrow with four-sided serrated arrowhead, used only after Humame depleted; Pulung Waliman is an arrow with two-sided arrowhead, with three large teeth, and hole in the middle, only used to kill enemy chieftain. In addition, for hunting three kinds of arrows are used, Hiruan which have similar characteristic as war Hiruan other than different shape; Maigue is an arrow with two-pronged tip; and Ka'ai is an arrow with three-pronged tip.

The Papuan parang called Yali made from old swang wood, take 2–3 days to make and can be made before or after drying the wood. It can be used for household purposes, namely cooking, cutting meat, cutting vegetables and cutting down sago. In addition, Papuan machetes are also used in the agricultural industry and be used as a collection. Usually it will have carving symbolizing prosperity for humans or prosperity for animals.

Papuan oars are traditional Papuan tools called Roreng for males and Biareng for females. They are made from swang wood and the bark of sago trees. The wood was split to create flat surface and then shaped like an oar, with the tip made thinner and sharper. It primarily functioned as an oar to propel canoes forward, but under attack from enemies from the seas it can be used as spear because of its sharp tip. Usually oars have ornamental engravings shaped like a finger called Hiokagema to symbolize unity of strength of ten fingers to power the oars.

Papuan Stone Axes from Sentani are called Mamehe usually made from river stones secured to the handle with rattan. Usually it was made from batu pualan (marble) which was then shaped with another stone by chipping slowly. According local tradition the making of the stone have to be done secretly from the family, and can take up to 2 months. For the handle it was constructed using swang wood or ironwood. One part was to secure the axe head and another for the handle, with all parts tied together using rattan. the axe are usually made for cutting down trees and canoes building, however currently used more often as collections.

Music and handicrafts 

Tifa is a traditional Papuan musical instrument that is played by beating. Unlike those from Maluku, this musical instrument from Papua is usually longer and has a handle on one part of the instrument. Meanwhile, the tifa from Maluku has a wide size and there is no handle on the side. The material used also comes from the strongest wood, usually the type of Lenggua wood (Pterocarpus indicus) with animal skin as the upper membrane. The animal's skin is tied with rattan in a circle so that it is tight and can produce a beautiful sound. In addition, on the body part of the musical instrument there is a typical Papuan carving. Tifa is usually used to accompany guest welcoming events, traditional parties, dances, etc. The size of the sound that comes out of the drum depends on the size of the instrument. Apart from being a means of accompanying the dance, the tifa also has a social meaning based on the function and shape of the carved ornaments on the body of the tifa. In the culture of the Marind-Anim people in Merauke, each clan has its own shape and motif as well as a name for each tifa. The same goes for the Biak and Waropen people.

The triton is a traditional Papuan musical instrument that is played by blowing it. This musical instrument is found throughout the coast, especially in the Biak, Yapen, Waropen and Nabire. Initially, this tool was only used as a means of communication or as a means of calling and signaling. Currently this instrument is also used as a means of entertainment and traditional musical instruments.

Cuisine 

The native Papuan food usually consists of roasted boar with Tubers such as sweet potato. The staple food of Papua and eastern Indonesia in general is sago, as the counterpart of central and western Indonesian cuisines that favour rice as their staple food. Sago is either processed as a pancake or sago congee called papeda, usually eaten with yellow soup made from tuna, red snapper or other fishes spiced with turmeric, lime, and other spices. On some coasts and lowlands on Papua, sago is the main ingredient to all the foods. Sagu bakar, sagu lempeng, and sagu bola, has become dishes that is well known to all Papua, especially on the custom folk culinary tradition on Mappi, Asmat and Mimika. Papeda is one of the sago foods that is rarely found. As Papua is considered as a non-Muslim majority regions, pork is readily available everywhere. In Papua, pig roast which consists of pork and yams are roasted in heated stones placed in a hole dug in the ground and covered with leaves; this cooking method is called bakar batu (burning the stone), and it is an important cultural and social event among Papuan people.

In the coastal regions, seafood is the main food for the local people. One of the famous sea foods from Papua is fish wrap (Indonesian: Ikan Bungkus). Wrapped fish in other areas is called Pepes ikan. Wrapped fish from Papua is known to be very fragrant. This is because there are additional bay leaves so that the mixture of spices is more fragrant and soaks into the fish meat. The basic ingredient of Papuan wrapped fish is sea fish, the most commonly used fish is milkfish. Milkfish is suitable for "wrap" because it has meat that does not crumble after processing. The spices are sliced or cut into pieces, namely, red and bird's eye chilies, bay leaves, tomatoes, galangal, and lemongrass stalks. While other spices are turmeric, garlic and red, red chilies, coriander, and hazelnut. The spices are first crushed and then mixed or smeared on the fish. The wrapping is in banana leaves.

Common Papuan snacks are usually made out of sago. Kue bagea (also called sago cake) is a cake originating from Ternate in North Maluku, although it can also be found in Papua. It has a round shape and creamy color. Bagea has a hard consistency that can be softened in tea or water, to make it easier to chew. It is prepared using sago, a plant-based starch derived from the sago palm or sago cycad. Sagu Lempeng is a typical Papuan snacks that is made in the form of processed sago in the form of plates. Sagu Lempeng are also a favorite for travelers. But it is very difficult to find in places to eat because this bread is a family consumption and is usually eaten immediately after cooking. Making sago plates is as easy as making other breads. Sago is processed by baking it by printing rectangles or rectangles with iron which is ripe like white bread. Initially tasteless, but recently it has begun to vary with sugar to get a sweet taste. It has a tough texture and can be enjoyed by mixing it or dipping it in water to make it softer. Sago porridge is a type of porridge that are found in Papua. This porridge is usually eaten with yellow soup made of mackerel or tuna then seasoned with turmeric and lime. Sago porridge is sometimes also consumed with boiled tubers, such as those from cassava or sweet potato. Vegetable papaya flowers and sautéed kale are often served as side dishes to accompany the sago porridge. In the inland regions, Sago worms are usually served as a type of snack dish. Sago worms come from sago trunks which are cut and left to rot. The rotting stems cause the worms to come out. The shape of the sago worms varies, ranging from the smallest to the largest size of an adult's thumb. These sago caterpillars are usually eaten alive or cooked beforehand, such as stir-frying, cooking, frying and then skewered. But over time, the people of Papua used to process these sago caterpillars into sago caterpillar satay. To make satay from this sago caterpillar, the method is no different from making satay in general, namely on skewers with a skewer and grilled over hot coals.

See also

 Free Papua Movement
 Asmat Swamp
 Districts of Papua
 List of earthquakes in Indonesia
 List of rivers of Papua
 Papua conflict

References

Cited works

External links

 
 Languages and ethnic groups of Papua Province SIL Ethnologue

 

Provinces of Indonesia
Arafura Sea
New Guinea
Autonomous provinces
Ethnic conflicts in Indonesia
Articles containing video clips
States and territories established in 1963
1963 establishments in Indonesia